Fast Simplex Link is a 32-bit wide interface on MicroBlaze. The FSL channels are uni-directional, point-to-point data streaming interfaces. The FSL can be used for extending the processor execution unit with custom hardware accelerators thanks to a low latency dedicated interface to the processor pipeline. In addition, the same FSL channel can be used to transmit or receive either control or data words. A separate bit indicates whether the transmitted, or received, word is control or data information.

External links
 Fast Simplex Link (FSL) Bus (v2.11c) Data Sheet

Soft microprocessors